McGennis is a surname. Notable people with the surname include:

Marian McGennis (born 1953), Irish politician
Paul McGennis, Irish Roman Catholic priest

See also
McGinnis